George Edward Foreman (born January 10, 1949) is an American former professional boxer, entrepreneur, minister and author. In boxing, he was nicknamed "Big George" and competed between 1967 and 1997. He is a two-time world heavyweight champion and an Olympic gold medalist. As an entrepreneur, he is known for the George Foreman Grill.

After a troubled childhood, Foreman took up amateur boxing and won a gold medal in the heavyweight division at the 1968 Summer Olympics. Having turned professional the next year, he won the world heavyweight title with a stunning second-round knockout of then-undefeated Joe Frazier in 1973. He defended the belt twice before suffering his first professional loss to Muhammad Ali in the iconic Rumble in the Jungle in 1974. Unable to secure another title opportunity, Foreman retired after a loss to Jimmy Young in 1977.

Following what he referred to as a religious epiphany, Foreman became an ordained Christian minister. Ten years later he announced a comeback, and in 1994 at age 45 won the unified WBA, IBF, and lineal heavyweight championship titles by knocking out 26-year-old Michael Moorer. He dropped the WBA belt rather than face his mandatory title defense soon after, and following a single successful title defense against Axel Schulz, Foreman relinquished his IBF title as well on June 28, 1995. At 46 years and 169 days old, he was the oldest world heavyweight champion in history. Foreman is the oldest to ever win the world heavyweight boxing championship of major honors, and the second-oldest in any weight class after Bernard Hopkins (at light heavyweight). He retired in 1997 at the age of 48, with a final record of 76 wins (68 knockouts) and 5 losses.

Foreman has been inducted into the World Boxing Hall of Fame and International Boxing Hall of Fame. The International Boxing Research Organization rates Foreman as the eighth-greatest heavyweight of all time. In 2002, he was named one of the 25 greatest fighters of the past 80 years by The Ring. The Ring ranked him as the ninth-greatest puncher of all time. He was a ringside analyst for HBO's boxing coverage for 12 years until 2004. Outside boxing, he is a successful entrepreneur and known for his promotion of the George Foreman Grill, which has sold more than 100 million units worldwide. In 1999, he sold the commercial rights to the grill for $138 million.

Early life and amateur career
George Foreman was born in Marshall, Texas. He grew up in the Fifth Ward community of Houston, Texas, with six siblings. Although he was raised by J. D. Foreman, whom his mother had married when George was a small child, his biological father was Leroy Moorehead. By his own admission in his autobiography, George was a troubled youth. He dropped out of school at the age of 15 and spent time as a mugger. At age 16, Foreman had a change of heart and convinced his mother to sign him up for the Job Corps after seeing an ad for the Corps on TV. As part of the Job Corps, Foreman earned his GED and trained to become a carpenter and bricklayer. After moving to Pleasanton, California, with the help of a supervisor, he began to train. Foreman was interested in football and idolized Jim Brown, but gave it up for boxing.

1968 Summer Olympics

Foreman won a gold medal in the boxing/heavyweight division at the 1968 Mexico City Olympic Games. In the finals, Foreman defeated the Soviet Union's Jonas Čepulis;  the referee stopped the fight in the second round.  Čepulis' face was already bleeding in the first round from Foreman's punches, and had to take a standing eight count early in the second round. Čepulis, fighting out of Lithuania, was a 29-year-old veteran with a 12-year-long amateur career, having over 220 fights in his record, quite experienced, and 10 years older than Foreman.
 Round of 16: defeated Lucjan Trela (Poland) on points, 4–1
 Quarterfinal: defeated Ion Alexe (Romania) referee stopped contest, 3rd round
 Semifinal: defeated Giorgio Bambini (Italy) by a second-round knockout
 Final: defeated Jonas Čepulis (Soviet Union) referee stopped contest, second round
After winning the gold-medal fight, Foreman walked around the ring carrying a small U.S. flag and bowing to the crowd. Foreman maintained that earning the Olympic gold medal was the achievement he was most proud of in his boxing career, more so than either of his world titles.

Amateur accomplishments
 He won his first amateur fight on January 26, 1967, by a first-round knockout in the Parks Diamond Belt Tournament.
 He won the San Francisco Examiner's Golden Gloves Tournament in the Junior Division in February 1967.
 In February 1967, he knocked out Thomas Cook to win the Las Vegas Golden Gloves in the Senior Division.
 In February 1968, he knocked out L.C. Brown to win the San Francisco Examiner's Senior Title in San Francisco.
 In March 1968, he won the National Boxing Championships heavyweight title in Toledo, Ohio, vs. Henry Crump of Philadelphia in the final.
 He sparred five rounds on two different occasions in  July 1968 with former World Heavyweight Champion Sonny Liston (Liston sparred in 22-oz custom-made Everlast gloves, Foreman later recalled that Liston was the only man who forced him to back up consistently in the ring.)
 On September 21, 1968, he won his second decision over Otis Evans to make the U.S. boxing team for the Mexico City Olympic Games.
 Foreman had a 16–4 amateur boxing record going into the Olympics. He knocked out the Soviet Union's Jonas Čepulis to win the Olympic Games Heavyweight Gold Medal. He was trained for the Olympic Games by Robert (Pappy) Gault.
 His amateur record was 22–4 when he turned professional.

Professional career
Foreman turned professional in 1969 with a three-round knockout of Donald Walheim in New York City. He had a total of 13 fights that year, winning all of them (11 by knockout).

In 1970, Foreman continued his march toward the undisputed heavyweight title, winning all 12 of his bouts (11 by knockout). Among the opponents he defeated were Gregorio Peralta, whom he decisioned at Madison Square Garden, although Peralta showed that Foreman was vulnerable to fast counter-punching mixed with an assertive boxing style. Foreman then defeated George Chuvalo by technical knockout (TKO) in three rounds. After this win, Foreman defeated Charlie Polite in four rounds and Boone Kirkman in three. Peralta and Chuvalo were Foreman's first world-level wins. Peralta was the number-10 ranked heavyweight in the world in January 1970 per The Ring, while Chuvalo was number seven in the world per their March 1971 issue.

In 1971, Foreman won seven more fights, winning all of them by knockout, including a rematch with Peralta, whom he defeated by knockout in the 10th and final round in Oakland, California, and a win over Leroy Caldwell, whom he knocked out in the second round. After amassing a record of 32–0 (29 KO), he was ranked as the number-one challenger by the World Boxing Association and World Boxing Council.

Title Reign

Sunshine Showdown: Foreman vs. Frazier

In 1972, still undefeated and with an impressive knockout record, Foreman was set to challenge undefeated and undisputed World Heavyweight Champion Joe Frazier. Despite boycotting a title elimination caused by the vacancy resulting from the championship being stripped from Muhammad Ali, Frazier had won the title from Jimmy Ellis and defended his title four times since, including a 15-round unanimous decision over the previously unbeaten Ali in 1971 after Ali had beaten Oscar Bonavena and Jerry Quarry. Despite Foreman's superior size and reach, he was not expected to beat Frazier and was a 3:1 underdog going into the fight.

The Sunshine Showdown took place on January 22, 1973, in Kingston, Jamaica, with Foreman dominating the fight to win the championship by TKO. In ABC's rebroadcast, Howard Cosell made the memorable call, "Down goes Frazier! Down goes Frazier! Down goes Frazier!" Before the fight, Frazier was 29–0 (25 KO) and Foreman was 37–0 (34 KO). Frazier was knocked down six times by Foreman within two rounds (the three-knockdown rule was not in effect for this bout). After the second knockdown, Frazier's balance and mobility were impaired to the extent that he was unable to evade Foreman's combinations. Frazier managed to get to his feet for all six knockdowns, but referee Arthur Mercante eventually called an end to the one-sided bout.

Foreman was sometimes characterized by the media as an aloof and antisocial champion. According to them, he always seemed to wear a sneer and was not often available to the press. Foreman later attributed his demeanor during this time as an emulation of Sonny Liston, for whom he had been an occasional sparring partner. Foreman defended his title successfully twice during his initial reign as champion. His first defense, in Tokyo, pitted him against Puerto Rican Heavyweight Champion José Roman. Roman was not regarded as a top contender, but had managed to beat a few decent fighters such as EBU champion Spain Jose Manuel Urtain, and was ranked the number-seven heavyweight in the March 1973 issue of The Ring. Foreman needed only two minutes to end the fight, one of the fastest knockouts in a heavyweight championship bout.

The Caracas Caper: Foreman vs. Norton

Foreman's next defense was against a much tougher opponent. In 1974, in Caracas, Venezuela, he faced the highly regarded future hall-of-famer Ken Norton (who was 30–2), a boxer noted for his awkward crossed-arm boxing style, crab-like defense, and heavy punch (a style Foreman emulated in his comeback), who had broken the jaw of Muhammad Ali in a points victory a year earlier. Norton had performed well against Ali in their two matches, winning the first on points and nearly winning the second. (Norton developed a reputation for showing nerves against heavy hitters, largely beginning with this fight.)  After an even first round, Foreman staggered Norton with an uppercut a minute into round two, buckling him into the ropes.  Norton did not hit the canvas, but continued on wobbly legs, clearly not having recovered, and shortly he went down a further two times in quick succession, with the referee intervening and stopping the fight. "Ken was awesome when he got going. I didn't want him to get into the fight", Foreman said when interviewed years later. This fight became known as the "Caracas Caper".

Foreman had cruised past two of the top names in the rankings. The win gave him a 40–0 record with 37 knockouts.

Losing the title

The Rumble in the Jungle: Foreman vs. Ali

Foreman's next title defense, on October 30, 1974, in Kinshasa, Zaire, against Muhammad Ali, was historic. The bout, promoted as the "Rumble in the Jungle", exceeded even its wildest expectations.

During training there in mid-September Foreman suffered a cut above his eye, forcing postponement of the match for a month. The injury affected his training regimen, as it meant he could not spar in the build-up to the fight and risk the cut being reopened. He later commented: "That was the best thing that happened to Ali when we were in Africa—the fact that I had to get ready for the fight without being able to box." Ali used this time to tour Zaire, endearing himself to the public, while taunting Foreman at every opportunity. Foreman was favored, having crushed undefeated heavyweight champion Joe Frazier and toppled formidable challenger Ken Norton both within two rounds.

When Foreman and Ali finally met in the ring, Ali began more aggressively than expected, outscoring Foreman with superior punching speed. In the second round, Ali retreated to the ropes, shielding his head and hitting Foreman in the face at every opportunity. Foreman dug vicious body punches into Ali's sides; however, Foreman was unable to land many big punches to Ali's head. The ring ropes were unusually loose, and Foreman later charged that Angelo Dundee (Ali's longtime trainer) had loosened them as part of Ali's tactic to lean back and away from the wild swings before clinching Foreman behind the head; Dundee stated that not only did he tighten the ropes because they were so loose due to the heat, Ali came up with the "rope-a-dope" strategy entirely on his own. Ali had been known as a fighter of speed and movement, but the rope-a-dope technique worked exactly to plan, since Foreman had not had a fight that lasted past the fourth round since 1971.

Ali continued to take heavy punishment to the body in exchange for the opportunity to land a hard jolt to Foreman's head. Ali later said he was "out on his feet" twice during the bout. As Foreman began to tire, his punches began to lose power and became increasingly wild. By mid-bout an increasingly confident Ali began to taunt the exhausted champion relentlessly, who had been reduced to mere pawing and landing harmless rubber-armed blows. Late in the eighth round Ali came off the ropes with a series of successively harder and more accurate right hooks to the side and back of Foreman's head, leaving him dazed and careening backwards.  After a lightning two-punch flurry squared him up, Ali ended the bout with a combination of solid left hook and straight right flush to the jaw that sent Foreman windmilling hard to the canvas, the first time he had been down in his career.

Foreman later reflected, "it just wasn't my night". Foreman later also claimed he was drugged by his trainer prior to the bout. Though he sought a rematch with Ali, he was unable to secure one. In some quarters it was suggested Ali was ducking him, taking on low-risk opponents such as Chuck Wepner, Richard Dunn, Jean Pierre Coopman, and Alfredo Evangelista.  But Ali also fought formidable opponents, such as Ron Lyle, and gave rematches to the still-dangerous Frazier and Ken Norton, the only two men to have ever beaten him.  And Foreman clearly lost his edge after the dazing upset in Zaire.  Still, a potentially massive money-making encore with Foreman never happened, whatever the reason.

First comeback

Foreman remained inactive during 1975. In 1976, he announced a comeback and stated his intention of securing a rematch with Ali. His first opponent was to be Ron Lyle, who had been defeated by Ali in 1975, via 11th-round TKO. Lyle was the number-five rated heavyweight in the world at the time per the March 1976 issue of the Ring. At the end of the first round, Lyle landed a hard right that sent Foreman staggering across the ring. In the second round, Foreman pounded Lyle against the ropes and might have scored a KO, but due to a timekeeping error, the bell rang with a minute still remaining in the round and Lyle survived. In the third, Foreman pressed forward, with Lyle waiting to counter off the ropes. In the fourth, a brutal slugfest erupted. A cluster of power punches from Lyle sent Foreman to the canvas. When Foreman got up, Lyle staggered him again, but just as Foreman seemed finished, he retaliated with a hard right to the side of the head, knocking down Lyle. Lyle beat the count, then landed another brutal combination, knocking Foreman down for the second time. Again, Foreman beat the count. Foreman said later that he had never been hit so hard in a fight and remembered looking down at the canvas and seeing blood. In the fifth round, both fighters continued to ignore defense and traded their hardest punches, looking crude. Each man staggered the other, and each seemed almost out on his feet. Then, as if finally tired, Lyle stopped punching, and Foreman delivered a dozen unanswered blows until Lyle collapsed to the canvas. Lyle remained down, giving Foreman a KO victory. The fight was named by The Ring as "The Fight of the Year".

Foreman vs Frazier 2 
For his next bout, Foreman chose to face Joe Frazier in a rematch. Frazier was then the world's number-three heavyweight per The Ring. Because of the one-sided Foreman victory in their first fight, and the fact that Frazier had taken a tremendous amount of punishment from Ali in Manila a year earlier, few expected him to win. Frazier at this point was 32–3, having lost only to Foreman and Ali twice, and Foreman was 41–1, with his sole defeat at the hands of Ali. However, their rematch began competitively, as Frazier used quick head movements to make Foreman miss with his hardest punches. Frazier was wearing a contact lens for his vision, which was knocked loose during the bout. Unable to mount a significant offense, Frazier was eventually floored twice by Foreman in the fifth round and the fight was stopped. Next, Foreman knocked out Scott LeDoux in three rounds and prospect John Dino Denis in four to finish the year.

Retirement and spiritual rebirth

Foreman had a life-changing year in 1977. After knocking out Pedro Agosto in four rounds at Pensacola, Florida, Foreman flew to Puerto Rico a day before the fight without giving himself time to acclimatize. His opponent was the skilled boxer Jimmy Young, who had beaten Ron Lyle and lost a very controversial decision to Muhammad Ali the previous year. Foreman fought cautiously early on, allowing Young to settle into the fight. Young constantly complained about Foreman pushing him, for which Foreman eventually had a point deducted by the referee, although Young was never warned for his persistent holding. Foreman badly hurt Young in round seven, but was unable to land a finishing blow. Foreman tired during the second half of the fight and suffered a knockdown in round twelve before losing by unanimous decision.

Christianity 
Foreman became ill in his dressing room after the fight. He was suffering from exhaustion and heatstroke and stated he had a near-death experience. He spoke of being in a hellish, frightening place of nothingness and despair, and realized that he was in the midst of death. Though not yet religious, he began to plead with God to help him. He explained that he sensed God asking him to change his life and ways. When he said, "I don't care if this is death – I still believe there is a God!"

After this experience, Foreman became a born-again Christian, dedicating his life for the next decade to God. Although he did not formally retire from boxing, Foreman stopped fighting and became an ordained minister, initially preaching on street corners before becoming the minister of the Church of the Lord Jesus Christ in Houston and devoting himself to his family and his congregation. He also opened a youth center that bears his name. Foreman continues to speak about his experience on Christian television broadcasts such as The 700 Club and the Trinity Broadcasting Network.

Second comeback
In 1987, after 10 years away from the ring, Foreman surprised the boxing world by announcing a comeback at the age of 38. In his autobiography, he wrote that his primary motive was to raise money to fund the youth center he had created, which had required much of the money he had earned in the initial phase of his career. Another stated ambition was to fight Mike Tyson. For his first fight, he went to Sacramento, California, where he beat journeyman Steve Zouski by a knockout in four rounds. Although many thought his decision to return to the ring was a mistake, Foreman countered that he had returned to prove that age was not a barrier to people achieving their goals (as he said later, he wanted to show that age 40 is not a "death sentence"). He won four more bouts that year, gradually slimming down and improving his fitness. In 1988, he won nine times. Perhaps his most notable win during this period was a seventh-round knockout of former Light Heavyweight and Cruiserweight Champion Dwight Muhammad Qawi.

Having always been a deliberate fighter, Foreman had not lost much mobility in the ring since his first "retirement", although he found keeping his balance harder after throwing big punches and could no longer throw rapid combinations. He was still capable of landing heavy single blows, however. The late-round fatigue that had plagued him in the ring as a young man now seemed to be unexpectedly gone, and he could comfortably compete for 12 rounds. Foreman attributed this to his new, relaxed fighting style (he has spoken of how, earlier in his career, his lack of stamina came from an enormous amount of nervous tension).

By 1989, while continuing his comeback, Foreman had sold his name and face for the advertising of various products, selling everything from grills to mufflers on TV. For this purpose, his public persona was reinvented, and the formerly aloof, ominous Foreman had been replaced by a smiling, friendly George. Ali and he had become friends, and he followed in Ali's footsteps by making himself a celebrity outside boxing.
Foreman continued his string of victories, winning five more fights, the most impressive being a three-round win over Bert Cooper, who went on to contest the undisputed heavyweight title against Evander Holyfield.

Foreman vs. Cooney

In 1990, Foreman met former title challenger Gerry Cooney in Atlantic City. Cooney was coming off a long period of inactivity, but was well regarded for his punching power. Cooney wobbled Foreman in the first round, but Foreman landed several powerful punches in the second round. Cooney was knocked down twice and Foreman scored a devastating KO. Foreman went on to win four more fights that year.

Foreman vs. Holyfield

The following year, Foreman was given the opportunity to challenge undisputed heavyweight champion Evander Holyfield, who was in tremendous shape at 208 pounds, for the world title in a pay-per-view boxing event. Very few boxing experts gave the 42-year-old Foreman a chance of winning. Foreman, who weighed in at 257 pounds, began the contest by marching forward, absorbing several of Holyfield's best combinations and occasionally landing a powerful swing of his own. Holyfield proved too tough and agile to knock down and was well ahead on points throughout the fight, but Foreman surprised many by lasting the full 12 rounds, losing his challenge on points. Round seven, in which Foreman knocked Holyfield off balance before being staggered by a powerful combination, was expected to be The Ring's "Round of the Year", though no award was given in 1991.

A year later, Foreman fought journeyman Alex Stewart, who had previously been stopped in the first round by Mike Tyson. Foreman knocked down Stewart twice in the second round, but expended a lot of energy in doing so. He was subsequently tired, and Stewart rebounded. By the end of the 10th and final round, Foreman's face was bloodied and swollen, but the judges awarded him a  majority decision win.

Foreman vs. Morrison

In 1993, Foreman received another title shot, although this was for the vacant WBO title. Foreman's opponent was Tommy Morrison, a young prospect known for his punching power. Morrison retreated throughout the fight, refusing to trade toe-to-toe, and sometimes he turned his back on Foreman. The strategy paid off and he outboxed Foreman from long range. After 12 rounds, Morrison won a unanimous decision.

In this period, Foreman also starred briefly in the situation comedy George on ABC.  The show, which featured Foreman as a retired boxer, premiered in November 1993, and ran for 10 episodes, where nine aired.  The show was co-produced by actor and former boxer Tony Danza.

Regaining the title: Foreman vs. Moorer

In 1994, Foreman again sought to challenge for the world championship after Michael Moorer had beaten Holyfield for the IBF and WBA titles.
Having lost his last fight against Morrison, Foreman was unranked and in no position to demand another title shot. His relatively high profile, however, made a title shot against Moorer, 19 years his junior, a lucrative prospect at seemingly little risk for the champion.

Foreman's title challenge against Moorer took place on November 5 in Las Vegas, Nevada, with Foreman wearing the same red trunks he had worn in his title loss to Ali 20 years earlier. This time, however, Foreman was a substantial underdog. For nine rounds, Moorer easily outboxed him, hitting and moving away, while Foreman chugged forward, seemingly unable to "pull the trigger" on his punches. Entering the 10th round, Foreman was trailing on all scorecards. However, he launched a comeback in the 10th round and hit Moorer with a number of punches. Then, a short right hand caught Moorer on the tip of his chin, gashing open his bottom lip, and he collapsed to the canvas. He lay flat on the canvas as the referee counted him out.

In an instant, Foreman had regained the title he had lost to Muhammad Ali two decades before. He went back to his corner and knelt in prayer as the arena erupted in cheers. With this historic victory, Foreman broke three records: He became, at age 45, the oldest fighter ever to win a world championship; 20 years after losing his title for the first time, he broke the record for the fighter with the longest interval between his first and second world championships; and the age spread of 19 years between the champion and challenger was the largest of any heavyweight boxing championship fight.

Champion once again

Foreman vs. Schulz

Prelude
Shortly after the 1994 Moorer fight, Foreman began talking about a potential superfight with Mike Tyson, then the youngest heavyweight champion on record. In 1995, The New York Times quoted Foreman as stating, "If he doesn't sign with Don King, we'll fight before the end of the year... I can't be bothered having trouble with Don King. Every contract has some complication." Tyson signed with King (and by 1998, was suing him for $100 million); the bout never materialized.

The WBA demanded that Foreman fight their number-one challenger, who at the time was the competent, but aging, Tony Tucker. For reasons not clearly known, Foreman refused to fight Tucker and allowed the WBA to strip him of that belt.

Schulz match

On April 22, 1995, Foreman fought midlevel underdog prospect Axel Schulz, of Germany, in defense of his remaining IBF title. Schulz jabbed strongly from long range, and exhibited increasing confidence as the fight progressed. Foreman finished the fight with a swelling over one eye, but was awarded a controversial majority decision. The IBF ordered an immediate rematch to be held in Germany; Foreman refused the terms and was stripped of his remaining title, yet continued to be recognized as the Lineal Heavyweight Champion.

Losing the title: Foreman vs. Briggs

In 1996, Foreman returned to Tokyo, scoring an easy win over the unrated Crawford Grimsley by a 12-round decision. In 1997, he faced contender Lou Savarese, winning a close decision in a grueling, competitive encounter. Then, yet another opportunity came Foreman's way as the WBC decided to match him against Shannon Briggs in a 1997 "eliminator bout" for the right to face WBC champion Lennox Lewis. After 12 rounds, in which Foreman consistently rocked Briggs with power punches, almost everyone at ringside saw Foreman as the clear winner. Like Foreman's fight with Schulz, the decision was highly controversial, but this time the decision went in favor of Foreman's opponent, with Briggs awarded a majority decision. One judge scored the bout 114–114, while the other two judges scored it 117–113 and 116–112 for Briggs. Foreman had fought for the last time, at the age of 48.

Final retirement

A travelogue series of the Walt Disney Parks and Resorts called The Walt Disney Magic Hour hosted by Foreman was supposed to debut as part of PAX's debut lineup in 1998, but never made it to air.

Foreman was gracious and philosophical in his loss to Briggs, but announced his "final" retirement shortly afterwards. However, he did plan a return bout against Larry Holmes in 1999, scheduled to take place at the Houston Astrodome on pay-per-view. The fight was to be billed as "The Birthday Bash" due to both fighters' upcoming birthdays. Foreman was set to make $10 million and Holmes was to make $4 million, but negotiations fell through and the fight was cancelled. With a continuing affinity for the sport, Foreman became a respected boxing analyst for HBO.

Foreman said he had no plans to resume his career as a boxer, but then announced in February 2004 that he was training for one more comeback fight to demonstrate that the age of 55, like 40, is not a "death sentence". The bout, against an unspecified opponent (rumored to be Trevor Berbick), never materialized (Foreman's wife was widely thought to have been a major factor in the change of plans). George Foreman left the sport of boxing after leaving HBO to pursue other opportunities.

Other works
In 2022, Foreman competed in season eight of The Masked Singer as "Venus Fly Trap". He was eliminated on "Hall of Fame Night" alongside George Clinton as "Gopher".

Personal life

Foreman has been married to Mary Joan Martelly since 1985. He had four previous marriages: to Adrienne Calhoun from 1971 to 1974, Cynthia Lewis from 1977 to 1979, Sharon Goodson from 1981 to 1982, and Andrea Skeete from 1982 to 1985.

Foreman has twelve children: five sons and seven daughters. His five sons are George Jr., George III ("Monk"), George IV ("Big Wheel"), George V ("Red"), and George VI ("Little Joey"). On his  website, Foreman explains, "I named all my sons George Edward Foreman so they would always have something in common. I say to them, 'If one of us goes up, then we all go up together, and if one goes down, we all go down together!'" As with his father, George III has pursued a career in boxing and entrepreneurship. George IV appeared on the second season of the reality television series American Grit, where he placed seventh.

His seven daughters are Natalia, Leola, Freeda, Michi, Georgetta, Isabella, and Courtney. Natalia and Leola are from his marriage to Mary Joan Martelly. His daughters from separate relationships were Freeda, Michi, and Georgetta. He adopted a daughter, Isabella Brandie Lilja (Foreman), in 2009, and another, Courtney Isaac (Foreman), in 2012. Freeda had a 5–1 record as a pro boxer, retired in 2001, and died in 2019 at age 42 in an apparent suicide. Isabella Foreman lives in Sweden, where she has blogged since 2010 under the name of BellaNeutella.

In recognition of Foreman's patriotism and community service, the American Legion honored him with its James V. Day "Good Guy" Award during its 95th National Convention in 2013.

George Foreman Grill

When Foreman came back from retirement, he argued that his success was due to his healthy eating. He was approached by Salton, Inc., which was looking for a spokesperson for its fat-reducing grill. , the George Foreman Grill has sold over 100 million units.

Although Foreman has never confirmed exactly how much he has earned from the endorsement,  Salton paid him $138 million in 1999 for the right to use his name. Prior to that, he was paid about 40% of the profits on each grill sold (earning him $4.5 million a month in payouts at its peak), yielding an estimated total of over $200 million just from the endorsement through 2011, substantially more than he earned as a boxer.

Professional boxing record

Exhibition boxing record

Bibliography
 George Foreman and Cherie Calbom (1996). George Foreman's Knock-Out-the-Fat Barbecue and Grilling Cookbook. .
 George Foreman (2000). George Foreman's Big Book Of Grilling Barbecue And Rotisserie: More than 75 Recipes for Family and Friends. .
 George Foreman & Connie Merydith (2000). The George Foreman Lean Mean Fat Reducing Grilling Machine Cookbook. Pascoe Publishing. .
 George Foreman and Joel Engel (2000). By George: The Autobiography of George Foreman. .
 George Foreman (2003). George Foreman's Guide to Life: How to Get Up Off the Canvas When Life Knocks You. Simon & Schuster. .
 George Foreman (2004). Great Grilling Recipes! The Next Grilleration. Pascoe Publishing. .
 George Foreman (2004). George Foreman's Indoor Grilling Made Easy: More Than 100 Simple, Healthy Ways to Feed Family and Friends. Simon & Schuster. .
 George Foreman (2005). The George Foreman Next Grilleration G5 Cookbook: Inviting. Pascoe Publishing. .
 George Foreman and Fran Manushkin (2005). Let George Do It!. Simon & Schuster Children's Publishing. .
 George Foreman and Ken Abraham (2007). God In My Corner: A Spiritual Memoir. Thomas Nelson. ASIN: B00FDYTJS2.

Filmography

Television

See also
Texas Sports Hall of Fame
 List of heavyweight boxing champions
 List of WBA world champions
 List of WBC world champions
 List of IBF world champions
 List of The Ring world champions
 List of undisputed boxing champions
 Notable boxing families

References

External links

 
 
 George Foreman profile at Cyber Boxing Zone
 Boxing Hall of Fame
 ESPN.com
 ESPN.com -- Biography
 George Foreman amateur boxing record
 
 
 
 Interview with George Foreman from the Texas Archive of the Moving Image

1949 births
Living people
American male film actors
American male television actors
American male voice actors
20th-century African-American sportspeople
21st-century African-American people
African-American boxers
African-American businesspeople
African-American Christian clergy
African-American Christians
American Christian clergy
American male boxers
American Protestants
Boxers at the 1968 Summer Olympics
International Boxing Federation champions
International Boxing Hall of Fame inductees
Medalists at the 1968 Summer Olympics
Olympic boxers of the United States
Olympic gold medalists for the United States in boxing
People from Marshall, Texas
Boxers from Houston
The Ring (magazine) champions
Winners of the United States Championship for amateur boxers
World Boxing Association champions
World Boxing Council champions
World heavyweight boxing champions